Ingvar Cronhammar (17 December 1947 – 20 May 2021) was a Swedish-Danish sculptor, who lived in Denmark from 1965 until his death. He gained a unique place in Danish art with his dark monumental works, often presenting an eerie confrontation between modern technology and the primitive past.

Biography

Born in Hässleholm in the south of Sweden, he moved to Denmark in 1965 where he studied at the Jutland Art Academy in Aarhus from 1967 to 1971. Until the early 1980s, inspired by environmental art from the U.S., his spectacular works revealed his fascination with conflict and provocation and his contempt for convention. An early example was Koncert for en hjemmeværnsmand (Concert for the Home Guard, 1969) featuring live chickens with lamps strapped to their backs. In 1979, he presented chairs draped with pigskin and a parasol with swastikas.

Over the years, his works became increasingly larger, often with a sacred look, simultaneously inducing fascination and disgust. The Gate (1988) presents an infernal machine of steel, sound, light, and movement, representing a confrontation with death. The direct confrontation of work and nature is also apparent in his gigantic Elia (1989–2001) in Herning, conceived as a fire-spitting temple of dark steel. His fascination with machines also produced works with animal bones, bird wings and skin, juxtaposing nature with culture and creating visions combining primitive elements with modern technology.

Cronhammar stands alone in Danish culture with his huge monumental, machine-like works which he created with dark materials such as mahogany, steel. and rubber. They can be found both in museums and as public works across the country. The Herning Museum of Contemporary Art exhibits a large collection of his works.

He died on May 20, 2021, at the age of 73 from blood clots in his heart.

Awards
In 1993, Cronhammar was awarded the Eckersberg Medal and, in 2003, the Thorvaldsen Medal. He was decorated a Knight of the Order of the Dannebrog in 2007.

References

Literature

External links
Ingvar Cronhammar's website
Comprehensive list of Cronhammar's works from KunstOnline
Illustrated portrait of Ingvar Cronhammar from KunstOnline

1947 births
2021 deaths
Swedish male sculptors
People from Hässleholm Municipality
Recipients of the Thorvaldsen Medal
Recipients of the Eckersberg Medal
Knights of the Order of the Dannebrog
Naturalised citizens of Denmark
Swedish contemporary artists
21st-century Swedish male artists